The Yarlung Tsangpo, also called Yarlung Zangbo is the upper stream of the Brahmaputra River located in the Tibet Autonomous Region, China. It is the longest river of Tibet and the fifth longest in China. The upper section is also called Dangque Zangbu meaning "Horse River."

Originating at Angsi Glacier in western Tibet, southeast of Mount Kailash and Lake Manasarovar, it later forms the South Tibet Valley and Yarlung Tsangpo Grand Canyon before passing into the state of Arunachal Pradesh, India. Downstream from Arunachal Pradesh the river becomes far wider and is called the Siang. After reaching Assam, the river is known as Brahmaputra. From Assam, the river enters Bangladesh at Ramnabazar. From there until about 200 years ago it used to flow eastward and joined the Meghna River near Bhairab Upazila. This old channel has been gradually dying. At present the main channel of the river is called Jamuna River, which flows southward to meet the Ganges, which in Bangladesh is called the Padma.

When leaving the Tibetan Plateau, the river forms the world's largest and deepest canyon, Yarlung Tsangpo Grand Canyon.

Description

The Yarlung Tsangpo River is the highest major river in the world. Its longest tributary is the Nyang River. Major tributaries of Yarlung Tsangpo include Nyangchu River, Lhasa River, Nyang River, and Parlung Tsangpo.

As it descends, the surrounding vegetation changes from cold desert to arid steppe to deciduous scrub vegetation. It ultimately changes into conifer and rhododendron forest. Sedimentary sandstone rocks found near the Tibetan capital of Lhasa contain grains of magnetic minerals that record the Earth's alternating magnetic field current.

The basin of the Yarlung River, bounded by the Himalayas in the south and Kang Rinpoche and Nyenchen Tanglha Mountains in the north, has less severe climate than the adjacent northern (and higher-altitude) parts of Tibet, and is home to most of the population of the Tibetan Autonomous Region.

The Yarlung Tsangpo Grand Canyon, formed by a horse-shoe bend in the river where it leaves the Tibetan Plateau and flows around Namcha Barwa, is the deepest, and possibly longest canyon in the world.

The Yarlung Tsangpo River has three major waterfalls in its course. The largest waterfall of the river, the "Hidden Falls", was not publicized in the West until 1998, when its sighting by Westerners was briefly hailed as a "discovery." They were even portrayed as the discovery of the great falls which had been the topic of stories told to early westerners by Tibetan hunters and Buddhist monks, but which had never been found by Western explorers at the time. The Chinese authorities contradicted, however, saying that Chinese geographers, who explored the gorge from 1973 on, had already taken pictures of the falls in 1987 from a helicopter.

Kayak exploration

Since the 1990s the Yarlung Tsangpo River has been the destination of a number of teams that engage in exploration and whitewater kayaking. The river has been called the "Everest of Rivers" because of the extreme conditions of the river. The first attempt to run was made in 1993 by a Japanese group who lost one member on the river.

In October 1998, a kayaking expedition sponsored by the National Geographic Society attempted to navigate the Yarlung Tsangpo Grand Canyon. Troubled by unanticipated high water levels, the expedition ended in tragedy with the death of expert kayaker Doug Gordon.

In January–February, 2002, an international group consisting of Scott Lindgren, Steve Fisher, Mike Abbott, Allan Ellard, Dustin Knapp, and Johnnie and Willie Kern, completed the first descent of the upper Tsangpo gorge section.

Dams and hydropower projects 

In November 2020, the chairman of PowerChina announced the construction of a "super" dam on the Yarlung Zangbo which would be the world's largest hydroelectric project.

References

External links
 River from Heaven Documentary film by CNTV (Chinese)

Rivers of Tibet
Brahmaputra River
Braided rivers in China
Zhongba County